Alastor carinulatus is a species of wasp in the family Vespidae.

References

carinulatus
Insects described in 2006